In computability theory a cylindric numbering is a special kind of numbering first introduced by Yuri L. Ershov in 1973. 

Usually  is not injective, but if  is a cylindric numbering we can always find an injective .

Definition 

A numbering  is called cylindric if 

That is if it is one-equivalent to its cylindrification

A set  is called cylindric if its indicator function 
 
is a cylindric numbering.

Examples 

 Every Gödel numbering is cylindric

Properties 

 Cylindric numberings are idempotent:

References 

 Yu. L. Ershov, "Theorie der Numerierungen I." Zeitschrift für mathematische Logik und Grundlagen der Mathematik 19, 289-388 (1973).

Theory of computation